Atay is a masculine Turkish given name. It is also spelled as Atai in some cultures.

It may refer to:

Given name
 Atay Aktuğ, former president of the Turkish football club Trabzonspor

Surname
 Oğuz Atay (1934–1977), Turkish writer
 Dely Atay-Atayan (1914–2004), Filipina comedian

Fictional characters
 Cengiz Atay, main villain of Turkish crime drama Ezel
 Can Atay, son of Cengiz and Eyşan Atay of Turkish crime drama Ezel
 Eyşan Atay, wife of Cengiz Atay and girlfriend of Ezel "Ömer" of Turkish crime drama Ezel

Mythology
 Atai Ulaan or Atay Han, Buryat mythological figure

Places
 Nsit-Atai, local Government Area of Akwa Ibom State, Nigeria

References

Turkish-language surnames
Turkish masculine given names